Vehicle registration plates in Denmark normally have two letters and five digits and are issued by authorities. Plates can be obtained at authorized car dealers, vehicle inspection stations or official registration centers (Skat Motor center) The combination is simply a serial and has no connection with a geographic location, but the digits have number series based on vehicle type.

Danish registration plates do not follow the owner or the vehicle; when a car is sold the plates are turned in and the new owner must apply for new plates. An exception to this rule is when a car is sold privately from one person to another person, the new owner can use the current plates that are on the car.

Numbering before 2012 and format after 2012 

   

On the number combination one can see the type of a vehicle before 2012. Numbering after 2012 is completely random in order to allow for more combinations. Exceptions from this are diplomatic vehicles still using "76" and "77" and taxis/limousines using "98" and "99" The letters have no significance and are random. You can no longer determine the type of vehicle from the first two digits after 2012.

Types 

Hearses are registered as yellow-plate cars (commercial use). The actual plates are, however, white (personal use), reflecting the view that the deceased is a passenger rather than commercial freight.

EU plates 

A new design with an EU stripe was expected in 2008, but was thereafter delayed to 12 October 2009. This makes Denmark potentially the last EU country to adopt euro plates (Vehicle registration plates of Europe). The EU stripe is, however, currently optional. In preparation for the new design, the plate font was slightly condensed on some new plates issued after mid-2008. Since July 2009, buyers of a car could pick a license plate with or without an EU strip.

If a Danish registered vehicle does not have the plate with the EU stripe then it must be equipped with an approved oval DK-sign when driving abroad. If one drives both with a car and a caravan/trailer, both must bear the label. The sign shall be elliptical (oval) 175×115 mm, white background with black lettering. The letters must be 80 mm in height, the distance between them shall be 10 mm, and there shall be no advertising.

Autonomous countries

Faroe Islands 

Cars registered in the Faroe Islands before 1996 have plates with white background, black text in Danish style, but with black edge and only one letter, F. Cars registered after 1996 have white background, blue text in their own style, two letters and three digits. There is a blue stripe to the left with the Faroese flag and the code "FO". The Faroe Islands are outside the EU.

Greenland 

Plates have a white background, and black text in Danish style with the serial letters "GR" reserved for Greenland. The EU stripe is not applicable since Greenland is a non-EU member. Greenland unofficially uses the international registration code KN, but the official code to use is DK. The only way to transport a vehicle to or from Greenland is by container ship, which is time consuming and expensive due to the long distance, so it is rare for Greenlandic vehicles to drive outside Greenland.

Confusion with Norwegian plates
In 1971 Norway began with two letters and five digits, just after Denmark. In the beginning there was an informal system of avoiding the same code for a Norwegian and a Danish car, in which some letter combinations were used by Norway and some by Denmark. Norway having geographical codes used a higher number of letter combinations than Denmark. This was later abandoned, because of larger number of vehicles, so now a Norwegian and a Danish car can have same registration code, although they have national stripes now, and have always needed a national mark outside their country.

References

External links
 
 nrpl.dk - Comprehensive information about Danish license plates since their introduction

Denmark
Road transport in Denmark
Road transport in the Faroe Islands
Road transport in Greenland
Denmark transport-related lists
 Registration plates

da:Nummerplade#Danske nummerplader
fr:Plaque d'immatriculation danoise